Jean Deza (born 9 June 1993) is a former Peruvian footballer who plays as a winger for Peruvian club Cienciano.

Career

MŠK Žilina
In August 2011, he joined Slovak club MŠK Žilina on a four-year contract. His debut came on 27 August 2011 in the Corgoň Liga match against Dukla Banská Bystrica, entering in as a substitute in place of Roman Gergel. Jean Deza was linked to Argentinian club Boca Juniors, and Swiss Basel before joining his present club.

Montpellier HSC
In August 2013, he joined French club Montpellier HSC on loan for one year.

PFC Levski Sofia
In May 2016, Deza joined Bulgarian club Levski Sofia on a 2-year deal. On 7 February 2017, he terminated his contract with the club after not showing up at Levski's winter training camp. Because of that, the player and the club had resolved the argument with the help of FIFA.

International career
After some impressive performances for Montpellier, Jean Deza was called up for a friendly against England for England's World Cup 2014 warm up games. He started the game, putting in an impressive performance before later being substituted in the second half. The main highlight from Peru was when Deza tried to chip England's Joe Hart from 35 yards, only going over by a little.

References

External links
 Montpellier profile
 
 

1993 births
Living people
Peruvian footballers
Peruvian expatriate footballers
Peru under-20 international footballers
Peru international footballers
Association football midfielders
Peruvian people of French descent
Sportspeople from Callao]
Academia Deportiva Cantolao players
MŠK Žilina players
Club Deportivo Universidad de San Martín de Porres players
Montpellier HSC players
Club Alianza Lima footballers
PFC Levski Sofia players
Universidad Técnica de Cajamarca footballers
Deportivo Binacional FC players
FC Carlos Stein players
Unión Huaral footballers
Cienciano footballers
Ligue 1 players
Slovak Super Liga players
Peruvian Primera División players
Peruvian Segunda División players
First Professional Football League (Bulgaria) players
Peruvian expatriate sportspeople in Slovakia
Peruvian expatriate sportspeople in France
Peruvian expatriate sportspeople in Bulgaria
Expatriate footballers in Slovakia
Expatriate footballers in France
Expatriate footballers in Bulgaria